Herpystis jejuna is a moth of the family Tortricidae first described by Edward Meyrick in 1916. It is found in India, Sri Lanka, and Fiji.

Larval host plants are Cuscuta and Eugenia species.

References

External links
A new species of Herpystis Meyrick (Lepidoptera, Tortricidae) on Cuscuta reflexa in West Pakistan

Moths of Asia
Moths described in 1916